The Complete Walker is an in-depth guide to backpacking, written by Colin Fletcher with illustrations by political aide/women's rights advocate Nick Bauer. It was very influential and "could be credited with starting the backpacking industry." Since its first publishing in 1968, there have been three revised editions. The most recent edition, The Complete Walker IV, was co-authored by Chip Rawlins, with illustrations by Vanna Prince and Hannah Hinchman.

Editions
 The Complete Walker (1968)
 The New Complete Walker (1974)
 The Complete Walker III (1984)
 The Complete Walker IV (2002)

References

Complete Walker, The
Complete Walker, The
1968 non-fiction books
Hiking books